The 2022–23 season is the 92nd in the history of F.C. Famalicão and their fourth consecutive season in the top flight. The club will participate in the Primeira Liga, the Taça de Portugal, and the Taça da Liga.

Players

Out on loan

Transfers

Pre-season and friendlies

Competitions

Overall record

Primeira Liga

League table

Results summary

Results by round

Matches 
The league fixtures were announced on 5 July 2022.

Taça de Portugal

Taça da Liga

Third round

References 

F.C. Famalicão seasons
Famalicão